Hébertville is a municipality in Quebec.

Hébertville may also refer to:

Hébertville-Station, Quebec, Canada
Hébertville station, a railway station in Hébertville-Station, Quebec, Canada

See also
Herbertville